Jones Airport refers to the following U.S. airports:
 Dan Jones International Airport - Harris County, Texas (Greater Houston)
 Floyd W. Jones Lebanon Airport - Lebanon, Missouri

See also
 Carl T. Jones Field, officially Huntsville International Airport - Huntsville, Alabama
 Jones Field - Bonham, Texas
 Ken Jones Aerodrome - Port Antonio, Jamaica
 Tulsa Riverside Airport, formerly Richard Lloyd Jones Jr. Airport - Tulsa, Oklahoma